Jonesboro is an unincorporated historic community in Malheur County, Oregon, United States. It is located on U.S Route 20, between Juntura and Harper, near the Malheur River.

Jonesboro was a station on the Union Pacific Railroad. It was named for William Jones, a local cattle rancher. The now torn-up railroad line was decommissioned in the early 1990s.

References

External links
History of the Union Pacific Burns branch including an image of a scrap train near Jonesboro
More history of the UP with image of train near Jonesboro

Former populated places in Malheur County, Oregon
Ghost towns in Oregon